"B Boy" is a song by American hip hop recording artist Meek Mill. It was released as a third single from Dreams Worth More Than Money on January 3, 2015, by Maybach Music Group and Atlantic Records. The hip hop song, which was produced by Sap, features guest appearances from Big Sean and ASAP Ferg.

Critical reception
Tierney McAfee of Hollywood Life praised Big Sean's verse writing that "he seems to be rapping about random hookups in “B-Boy”, we’re sure it's just for show since we know he only has eyes for one woman — Ariana!". Writing for MTV, Adam Fleischer noted that the track has only bars instead of hook, commenting that "ain’t anything wrong with that".

Music video
A music video for the track, directed by Spike Jordan, was released on January 29, 2015.

Charts

References

External links
 

2015 singles
2015 songs
Meek Mill songs
Big Sean songs
ASAP Ferg songs
Maybach Music Group singles
Atlantic Records singles
Songs written by Big Sean
Songs written by Meek Mill
Songs written by ASAP Ferg